The 1996 Chrono des Herbiers was the 15th edition of the Chrono des Nations cycle race and was held on 20 October 1996. The race started and finished in Les Herbiers. The race was won by Chris Boardman.

General classification

References

1996
1996 in road cycling
1996 in French sport